Abaddon is the fourth solo studio album by American rapper Boondox. It was released on May 13, 2014 via Psychopathic Records, marking the rapper's first release for the label since his return in 2013 and final project, as he would leave again in April 2015, to later sign with Majik Ninja Entertainment in December 2016. Production was handled by Brian Kuma and Mike P., with Mike E. Clark serving as additional producer. It features guest appearances from Insane Clown Posse, Big Hoodoo, Crucifix, Demi Demaree, JellyRoll, SickTanic and Syn. The album debuted at number 147 on the US Billboard 200 albums chart.

History 
In late 2011 and early 2012 Boondox released 2 songs from his new album under preparation. The songs were "Abaddon" and "Monster". Shortly after that Boondox departed from the label. During the Insane Clown Posse seminar at the 2013 Gathering of the Juggalos, it was announced that Boondox had returned to Psychopathic.

Not until February 2014, during an interview with Bukshot and ClaAs - the two other members of The Underground Avengers -  did Boondox state that his next album was finished, and that he was hoping to release the album in April or May of that year. More was revealed about the record in the March 14, 2014 issue of the Hatchet Herald (Psychopathic Records' official newsletter). In the issue, the name of the album was announced as "Abaddon", and the release date was confirmed to be May 13, 2014. Regarding the record, it was said that "[The album is] not just gory horrorcore—though there's plenty of that—there's something genuinely unsettling about this record [...] You know that spooky ass feeling when you feel a shockwave shoot down your spine? Yeah, [hearing the album] was just like that [...] “Abaddon” is definitely not for the faint of heart or for those prone to nightmares. This is like a haunted house movie set to music—you’re going to be scared and who might even jump a little bit at some of the surprises contained within this album." Along with details of the album itself, it was also announced that Boondox would be performing in an upcoming tour titled The Wormwood Tour.

Amazon.com was the first website to publish the record's official track listing and guest features, including artists Big Hoodoo, Violent J, Crucifix, Insane Clown Posse, JellyRoll, Demi Demaree, and Syn of Zug Izland. On May 9th, 2014, goHastings listed Abaddon for purchase and listed lengths and snippings for each individual track on the album.

Promotion 
boondoxthescarecrow.com was edited to include images of seven "seals", each displaying a timer when hovered over. Each timer was a countdown until its respective seal's "breaking," and upon the breaking, the image of that seal was replaced with a "broken" version, and clicking on it would lead to a page featuring an apocalyptic-countdown-style narrative revealing more information about Abaddon. Each seal was scheduled to break at midnight on a certain day.

The first seal, entitled "A great star called Wormwood falls to the Earth", provided a grand introduction to the Abaddon era, describing the release of the album as an apocalyptic event, stating that "The One Who Walks Among The Crops would return to roam the world and spread his black magick unto the masses" upon the release of the record.

The second seal, entitled "...Seas and Oceans Become Blood", was accompanied by a 36-second teaser trailer for Abaddon. At this time, pre-orders for the record itself opened on HatchetGear.

The third seal, entitled "...Hail and fire, mixed with blood, is thrown to the Earth..." was accompanied by a six-page gallery of promotional images for Abaddon, mostly featuring Boondox himself.

The fourth seal, entitled "From out of the smoke, locusts were unleashed..." was accompanied by an interview with Boondox about the new record.

The fifth seal, entitled "Global earthquakes cause the cities of the world to collapse..." was accompanied by the release of the album's title track, 'Abaddon.' The song was actually a re-made version of a song Boondox had released for free in late 2011 through his official Twitter account titled "Abadon."

The sixth seal, entitled "Lightning and peals of thunder occurred, followed by an earthquake and a great hailstorm..." was accompanied by the release of the music video for the track introduced upon the breaking of the fifth seal.

The seventh seal, entitled "And the seven angels who had the seven trumpets prepared themselves to sound", broke at midnight on May 13, 2014, the release date of Abaddon. The breaking of this seal marked the album's release.

Lyrics and concept 
Within an interview on his website that was published upon the breaking of the fourth "seal", Boondox stated that the title of the album came from the Hebrew word meaning "destruction" or, literally, "place of destruction." Regarding the title, he stated, "To me, Abaddon is that destructive force that drives me. Is it a possession or just a chemical disorder? [...] All I know is that's the way I've always been. I just use Abaddon as a term to describe it. I like to think of it more like a possession." In the same interview, when asked about how Abaddon differs from the rest of his work lyrically, Boondox replied that "I get a lot more personal lyrically on some songs. There's more hidden meanings and riddles in the lyrics. They are more reality based. I think it's a little more clever on the word play than my previous records."

Release and reception 
In the official album review of Abaddon by Faygoluvers.net, the reviewer concluded that "After four years the Juggalos finally get to hear what Boondox has been hiding. To say he stepped up his game would be an understatement.  This album is hands down his best work to date. [...] With this and the new Axe Murder Boys album Psychopathic Records is showing they are not down for the count. The album charted at number 147 on the Billboard 200 and number 29 on the Indie chart. Abaddon is Boondox's lowest charting album he has released thus far.

Track listing 

Sample credits
Track 10 contains samples from "Monster" by Meg & Dia

Personnel

David "Boondox" Hutto – vocals (tracks: 2-15)
Sicktanik – vocals (track 1)
Damone "Big Hoodoo" Booth – vocals (track 4)
Joseph "Violent J" Bruce – vocals (tracks: 6, 11), additional vocals (track 2)
Cameron "Crucifix" Cruce – vocals (track 8)
Joseph "Shaggy 2 Dope" Utsler – vocals (track 11)
Jason "Jelly Roll" DeFord – vocals (track 13)
Demi Demaree – vocals (track 13)
Syn – vocals (track 15)
Courtney Desmett – additional vocals (track 3)
Ash "Lil Pig" – additional vocals (tracks: 3, 4, 8, 9, 11)
Michael "DJ Clay" Velasquez – additional vocals (track 7)
Brian Kuma – additional vocals (track 8), producer (tracks: 1-3, 7, 9, 10, 12, 14), mixing (track 1), engineering, recording
The Kids – additional vocals (track 12)
Leah Stalker – additional vocals (track 12)
Wolfpac – additional vocals (track 14)
Michael "Mike P." Puwal – producer (tracks: 4-6, 8, 11, 13, 15)
Michael Earl Clark – additional producer (track 2), mixing (tracks: 2-15)
Jim Kissling – mastering
Brandon "Bowski" Calhoun – artwork, layout
Paul Carnegie – artwork

Charts

References

2014 albums
Boondox albums
Horrorcore albums
Psychopathic Records albums